John Tallis  (7 November 1817 – 3 June 1876) was an English cartographic publisher.<ref name="Boase">Boase, F., Modern English biography, 6 vols, 1892-1921</ref> His company, John Tallis & Company, published views, maps and atlases in London from roughly 1838 to 1851.

Tallis set up as a publisher with Frederick Tallis in Cripplegate in 1842; the business moved to Smithfield in 1846, and was dissolved in 1849. From 1851 to 1854 Tallis operated as John Tallis & Company. He started the Illustrated News of the World'' which issued engraved portraits as supplements in a series entitled ‘National Portrait Gallery of eminent personages' in 1858, selling it for £1,370 in 1861; it folded in 1863. The series was subsequently republished in a number of separate volumes.

He lived in New Cross, South East London. His house on New Cross Road is listed as a Building of Special Architectural or Historic Interest, grade II. It has a blue plaque on the wall to signal the event.

References

1817 births
1876 deaths
Publishers (people) from London
English cartographers
19th-century British newspaper publishers (people)
19th-century English businesspeople